The West Virginia Future Fund is a permanent trust fund which began operations in March 2014. It was established via the passage of SB 461 and SJR 14 to make the fund constitutionally protected under West Virginia law. Funding comes from a 25% natural gas and oil severance tax. Under the law, only the interest and other income will be spent, while the principal will accumulate.

Beginning in 2020, the fund will start paying out dividends to finance activities such as education, human resource development, economic development, infrastructure development, and tax relief. The fund is expected to reach $127 million by 2019. It will remain in the control of the West Virginia Treasurer's Office, and will be invested by the West Virginia Investment Management Board.

References

Severance taxes
Government of West Virginia
Wills and trusts
Investment Trusts of the United States